The Mezquital pupfish (Cyprinodon meeki) is a species of pupfish in the family Cyprinodontidae. It is endemic to Durango in Mexico. The specific name honors the American ichthyologist Seth Eugene Meek (1859-1914), a pioneer of the study of the freshwater fish of Mexico.

References

Cyprinodon
Endemic fish of Mexico
Freshwater fish of Mexico
Endangered fish
Taxa named by Robert Rush Miller
Fish described in 1976
Taxonomy articles created by Polbot